Hamzehlu Rural District is a rural district (dehestan) in the Central District of Khomeyn County, Markazi Province, Iran. At the 2006 census, its population was 4,748, in 1,400 families. The rural district has 24 villages including Penderjohn, Sion, Zanjirak, Mahoorzan, and Chogan.

References 

Rural Districts of Markazi Province
Khomeyn County